Pseurotin A is a secondary metabolite of Aspergillus.

Biosynthesis
The gene cluster responsible for the biosynthesis of Pseurotin A was predicted by deletion and overexpression of polyketide synthase nonribosomal peptide synthetase hybrid enzyme gene, PsoA.  While it is unknown how the azaspirocyclic core of the pseurotin family of natural products is made, the post polyketide synthase modifications are known.  In-vivo and in-vitro studies showed the unique mechanism involved in the modification enzymes PsoC, PsoD, PsoE, and PsoF.  PsoD codes for a cytochrome P450, which is responsible for oxidizing the benzyl carbon (C17) to the conjugated ketone.  PsoC codes for a methyltransferase, which methylates the tertiary alcohol closest to the benzoyl moiety on C8.  PsoE is predicted to be a glutathione S-transferase gene, and isomerizes the C=C bond furthest down the tail from the E stereoisomer to the Z stereoisomer.  PsoF is unique in that its gene is encoded separate from the pseurotin gene cluster and is responsible for the epoxidation of the trans double bond that remains in the tail.  This epoxide is spontaneously hydrolyzed by either an SN2 mechanism to form pseurotin A, or by an SN2’ mechanism to form pseurotin D.

See also
14-Norpseurotin A

References

Spiro compounds